National Tsing Hua University (NTHU) is a public research university in Hsinchu City, Taiwan.

National Tsing Hua University was first founded in Beijing. After the Chinese Civil War, the then-president of the university, Mei Yiqi, and other major academics fled to Taiwan with the retreating Nationalist government. In 1956, they reinstalled National Tsing Hua University in Hsinchu, Taiwan, which has since remained independent and distinct from Tsinghua University in Beijing.

National Tsing Hua University is one of the six national research universities in Taiwan, and it is consistently ranked among the top three best universities in Taiwan in world university rankings. In the 2022 QS World University Rankings, it is ranked within the top 200 universities in the world and the top 50 universities in Asia.

The university is part of a leading research and innovation cluster in Taiwan, along with nearby National Yang Ming Chiao Tung University, National Space Organization, National Health Research Institutes, Industrial Technology Research Institute, National Synchrotron Radiation Research Center, National Center for High-Performance Computing, Taiwan Semiconductor Research Institute, and Industrial Technology Research Institute. The research cluster and its neighboring Hsinchu Science Park together play a key role in global semiconductor industry.

Today, there are 12 colleges or schools, 26 departments and 31 graduate institutes affiliated to NTHU. The college of Nuclear Science of NTHU is the sole educational and research institution focusing on the peaceful applications of nuclear power in Taiwan.

NTHU has educated a wide range of notable alumni, including Nobel Prize laureates Chen Ning Yang, Tsung-Dao Lee, and Yuan Tseh Lee.

Overview
In 1955, the President of Tsinghua University in Beijing, Mei Yi-chi left and re-established the National Tsing Hua Institute of Nuclear Technology in Hsinchu city, and later based on the foundation of the original institute, National Tsing Hua University was founded in Taiwan.

The two Tsinghua universities both claim to be successors of the original Tsinghua University. As a result of this dispute, the universities claimed to be the rightful recipient of the funds from the Boxer Rebellion indemnity that was used to start Tsinghua University. This indemnity was transferred to the university in Taiwan after the Nationalist government (Kuomintang) retreated to Taiwan.

Today, both Tsinghua universities have deep mutual cooperation, including an establishment of Tsinghua Strait Research Institute, dual degree program, MOOC program, and academic exchange program.

History

After American Secretary of State John Hay suggested that US$30 million Boxer Rebellion indemnity money paid to the United States was excessive, in 1909, President Roosevelt and the U.S. Congress agreed to reduce the Qing Dynasty's  indemnity payments by US$10.8 million, on the condition that the funding be used as scholarships for Chinese students to study in the United States. Using this fund, Tsinghua College (Qīnghuá Xuétáng) was established in Beijing, China, on 22 April 1911 on the site of a former royal garden belonging to a prince. It was initially a preparatory school for students sent by the government to study in the United States. The faculty members for the sciences were recruited by the YMCA from the United States and its graduates transferred directly to American schools as juniors upon graduation. In 1925, the school established its College Department and started its research institute on Chinese Study.

In 1928, the authority officially changed its name to National Tsing Hua University (NTHU). During the Second World War in 1937, Tsinghua University, Peking University, and Nankai University merged to form Changsha Temporary University in Changsha, and later National Southwestern Associated University in Kunming. After the war, Tsinghua moved back to Beijing and resumed its operation there.

During the Sino-Japanese War, the library lost 200,000 volumes, out of a total of 350,000.

In 1956, National Tsing Hua University (NTHU) was reinstalled on its current campus in Hsinchu, Taiwan. Since its reinstallation, NTHU has developed from an institute focusing on Nuclear Science and Technology to that of a comprehensive research university offering degrees programs ranging from baccalaureate to doctorate in science, technology, engineering, humanities and social sciences, as well as management. NTHU has been consistently ranked as one of the premier universities in Taiwan and is widely recognized as the best incubator for future leaders in industries as well as academics. Such stellar records are particularly exemplified by the outstanding achievements of alumni, including two Nobel laureates in physics (Dr. Chen-Ning Yang and Tsung-Dao Lee), one Nobel laureate in chemistry (Dr. Yuan-Tseh Lee) and one Wolf Prize winner in mathematics (Dr. Shiing-Shen Chern).

In recent decades, the National Tsing Hua University in Taiwan has had increasingly close ties with the Tsinghua University in People's Republic of China (China). Of all universities on Taiwan, the NTHU has arguably one of the strongest cooperations with universities in mainland China in academic research, projects, and with the creation of programs such as the "Center for Contemporary China".

Tradition

Meichu Tournament

The Mei-Chu Tournament, held in March annually, is a sport competition between National Tsing Hua University and National Yang Ming Chiao Tung University. Since its establishment in 1969, the tournament, also known as the Mei-Chu Games, has become a tradition, and is considered one of the most important activities between these two prestigious universities in Taiwan.

The history of the Meichu Games goes back to the 1960s. After the end of the Chinese Civil War in 1949, National Tsing Hua University and National Yang Ming Chiao Tung University were both relocated in Hsinchu, Taiwan and became neighbors. The geographic and academic closeness prompted many intellectual and social exchanges between two universities.

In 1966, an informal tournament was held. The arrangement of the formal event, however, was not institutionalized until 1968, when Chian Feng, an executive officer of NTHU student activity center, received the permission from the university authority to plan sport events for NTHU and NCTU students modeling after the Oxford and Cambridge Boat Race.

While both side agreed on the plan to hold such an annual event, there was a disagreement on the naming of the Games. At last, Zhang Zhi-yi solved this problem by proposing the conventional coin tossing. "If the head-side is up, the game would be called Mei-Chu; otherwise, the game would be called Chu-Mei." As the head-side of the coin went up, the tournament was thereby named Meichu to commemorate the two founding presidents of NTHU and NCTU, Mei Yi-chi and Ling Chu-Ming.

Campus life

Student clubs
There are more than one hundred student clubs serving diverse interests. Club activities range from community services, music and sports, cinema and theater, dancing and martial arts, religion and philosophy as well as scientific and academic interests.

Housing
There are eighteen dormitories on campus accommodating about 5000 students. Freshman, sophomore and most of the graduate students are allowed to lodge at dorms without drawing lots. The majority of NTHU faculty members are also living on campus.

Scholarships, fellowships, and financial aid
Scholarships and fellowships are awarded on a meritorious basis. Annually more than six hundred undergraduates and one hundred graduate students receive such supports. In addition, around four thousand graduate students are supported with teaching or research assistantships from academic units. For students with financial difficulties, the university provides student loans and emergency funds.

Health care and counseling services
A University Clinic, affiliated with Hsinchu Mackay Memorial Hospital, is located on campus where first aid and general medical services are provided.

The NTHU offers counseling service to students, faculty and staff members at the University Counseling Center. The clinic and the center not only provide services when needed and organize and present educational programs for all students.

Academics

College of Science
Interdisciplinary program of Sciences
Department of Physics
Department of Mathematics
Department of Chemistry
Institute of Statistics
Institute of Astronomy
Institute of Computational and Modeling Science
College of Engineering
Interdisciplinary Program of Engineering
Department of Chemical Engineering
Department of Materials Science and Engineering
Department of Power Mechanical Engineering
Department of Industrial Engineering and Engineering Management
Institute of Nano Engineering and MicroSystems
Institute of Biomedical Engineering
International Graduate Program
Graduate Molecular Engineering Program
Graduate Program of Advanced Energy
IEEM Professional Master's Program
Dual Master Program for Global Operation Management
College of Electrical Engineering and Computer Science
Interdisciplinary Program of Electrical Engineering and Computer Science
Department of Electrical Engineering
Department of Computer science
Institute of Electronics Engineering
Institute of Communications Engineering
Institute of Photonics Technologies
Institute of Information Systems and Applications
Institute of Information Security
College of Life Sciences and Medicine
School of Medicine
Interdisciplinary Program of Life Science
Department of Life Science
Department of Medical Science
Institute of System Neuroscience
Institute of Biotechnology
Institute of Molecular Medicine
Institute of Molecular and Cellular Biology
Institute of Bioinformatics and Structural Biology
College of Humanities and Social Sciences
Interdisciplinary Program of Humanities and Social Sciences
Department of Chinese Literature
Department of Foreign Languages and Literature
Institute of Anthropology
Institute of History
Institute of Philosophy
Institute of Sociology
Institute of Linguistics
Institute of Taiwan Literature
Institute of Sinophone Studies
Graduate Program on Taiwan Studies
International Master's Program in Inter-Asia Cultural Studies
College of Nuclear Science
Interdisciplinary Program of Nuclear Science
Department of Engineering and System Science
Department of Biomedical Engineering and Environmental Sciences
Institute of Nuclear Engineering and Science
Institute of Analytical and Environmental Sciences
College of Technology Management
Interdisciplinary Program of Management and Technology
Department of Economics
Department of Quantitative Finance
Institute of Technology Management
Institute of Law for Science and Technology
Institute of Service Science
EMBA
IMBA
 College of Education
 Interdisciplinary Program of Education
 Department of Education and Learning Technology
 Department of Kinesiology
 Department of Early Childhood Education
 Department of Special Education
Department of English Instruction
 Department of Educational Psychology and Counseling
Department of Environmental and Cultural Resources
 Institute of Human Resource Development
 Institute of Taiwan Languages and Language Teaching
 Institute of Learning Sciences and Technologies
 Institute of Mathematics and Science Education
 College of Arts
 Interdisciplinary Program of Technology and Art
 Department of Music 
 Department of Arts and Design 
 Institute of Art and Technology
 College of Semiconductor Research
 Taipei School of Economics and Political Science
 M.A. Program in Asian Political Economy
 M.A. Program in Global Political Economy and Asia
Tsing Hua College
Tsing Hua Interdisciplinary Program
Tsing Hua College International bachelor's degree Program
Residential College
Center for General Education
Center for Teacher Education
Center for Language Education
Research Center for Technology and Art
Regional Innovation Center
Arts Center
Military Instructors' Office
Physical Education Office
Research Centers
Research & Development Office
Computer & Communication Research Center
National Center for Theoretical Sciences
IC Design Tech. Center
Center for Science Technology and Society
Center for Nanotechology, Materials Science, and Microsystems
Center for Photonics Research
NTHU/ITRI Joint Research Center
Center for Contemporary China
Center for Energy and Environmental Research
Brain Research Center
Laboratory Animal Room
Instrument Center
Nuclear Science and Technology Development Center
Electronic Business Center
Quality Research Center
Advanced Packaging Research Center
Bioinformatics Center

International programs
NTHU participates in the Bioinformatics Program of the Taiwan International Graduate Program of Academia Sinica, Taiwan's most preeminent academic research institution.

Presidents
 Mei Yi-chi: 1956–1962
 : 1962–1969
 Yen Chen-hsing: 1969–1970
 Shu Shien-Siu: 1970–1975
 Chang Ming-che: 1975–1981
 Mao Gao-wen: 1981–1987
 Liu Chao-shiuan: 1987–1993
 R. C. T. Lee: 1993–1994
 Shen Chun-shan: 1994–1997
 : 1997–1998
 Chung Laung Liu: February 1998 – February 2002
 Frank Shu: February 2002 – February 2006
 Wen-Tsuen Chen: February 2006 – February 2010
 : February 2010 – February 2014
 HoCheng Hong: February 2014 – present

Rankings

NTHU is generally considered to be one of the best universities in Taiwan.

In 2021, Times Higher Education ranked National Tsing Hua University 351-400th in the world. The 2021 QS World University Rankings ranked National Tsing Hua University 168th overall. In 2021, U.S. News & World Report ranked National Tsing Hua University 363rd in the world. In 2020, Academic Ranking of World Universities ranked National Tsing Hua University 401-500th. The 2020 QS World University Rankings by Subject ranked the university: 84th in Engineering & Technology, 266th in Arts & Humanities, 401-500th in Life Sciences & Medicine, 101st in Natural Sciences, and 249th in Social Sciences & Management

In 2014, the representative of Japan in Taiwan listed NTHU as one of the seven well-known Taiwanese universities.

Notable alumni and faculty

Humanities and Social Sciences
Liang Qichao: well-known scholar, thinker, statesman, known as "the proud professor of speech"
Wang Guowei: Guoxue Master, known as "the founder of modern Chinese academic," "New History of Kaishanzushi"
Chen Yinke: linguist, historian
Zhao Yuanren: linguist
Zhu Ziqing: prose writer
Xia Nai: archaeologist
Feng Youlan: philosopher and historian of Chinese philosophy
David Zweig: social scientist, academic, and author

Physical Science & Engineering
Ta-You Wu: physicist, the former president of Academia Sinica, the Republic of China (Taiwan)
Hua Luogeng: mathematician and educator
Yu-Fen Zhao: CAS academician, Tsinghua University, Beijing, Xiamen University, a professor of chemistry
Shiing-Shen Chern: mathematician, Academician of Academia Sinica
Chen Ning Yang: winner of the Nobel Prize in Physics, Academia Sinica academician
Tsung-Dao Lee: winner of the Nobel Prize in Physics, Academia Sinica academician
Yuan Tseh Lee: winner of the Nobel Prize in Chemistry, Academician of Academia Sinica, the former president of Academia Sinica, the Republic of China
H. T. Kung: Harvard University Professor of Computer Science, National Academy of Engineering USA
Typhoon Lee: Academia Sinica, director of the Institute of Earth Sciences, Academia Sinica academicians
Way Kuo: President of City University of Hong Kong, former Bell Labs expert, Academician of Academia Sinica, 
Wei Shyy: President, Hong Kong University of Science & Technology, China
Wen-Tsuen Chen: former president of NTHU, Taiwan
Nancy Tang Chang: co-founder of the U.S. biotech company Tanox, chairman, president
Fa-Yueh Wu: mathematician and physicist, Professor of Northeastern University

See also
 List of universities in Taiwan
 Hsinchu Science Park
 National Experimental High School: A "Kindergarten through High School", established to provide special education opportunity to staff and faculty of NTHU and other Greater Science Park Area personnel.
 Academia Sinica
 Tsinghua Big Five Alliance
 Tsinghua University
 Tsinghua Shenzhen International Graduate School

References

External links

National Tsing Hua University (NTHU) Official Website

 
Educational institutions established in 1956
1956 establishments in Taiwan
Universities and colleges in Taiwan
Universities and colleges in Hsinchu
Comprehensive universities in Taiwan